Diana Sorel may refer to:

 Diana Sorel (film), a 1921 Italian silent film
 Diana Sorel (actress) (born 1946), a Spanish actress